The High-Potential Management Personnel Reserve is a program announced by President of Russia Dmitry Medvedev on 23 July 2008 at a meeting of his Plenipotentiary Representatives.

The Reserve 

In his discussions with his Plenipotentiaries, Medvedev recalled the nomenklatura system in the Soviet Union, which since the dissolution of the USSR the system has not been replaced, allowing cronyism to dictate appointments to senior positions within the Russian government. Medvedev acknowledged that sometimes position are sold to the highest bidder and regards this as disgraceful, stating "since the Russian government is a democracy, not a medieval tyranny, we must break out of this vicious circle, and work to involve the best, the most highly trained professionals, and motivate them, and we have to do it with the cooperation of the entire civil society."

Miriam Elder, writing for The Daily Telegraph, noted that the Reserve is an attempt by Medvedev to build his own power base, in order to assert his authority on the political stage in Russia.

First 100 

The list of the first 100 members of the High-Potential Management Personnel Reserve, which has invariably been dubbed the Golden 100 or the Presidential Gold Flock, was released by the President on 17 February 2009, and includes 36 people from Federal Government authorities, 23 people from regional authorities, 31 from business and 10 from science, education and non-governmental organisations backgrounds. The average age of candidates on the list is 39, and the youngest at 27 years of age are Vladimir Nazarov and Nikolay Nikiforov, whilst all are younger than 50 years of age. None of the first 100 members of the Reserve have served in the KGB or the FSB, and all have liberal leanings.

References

Dmitry Medvedev
Government of Russia